San Lorenzo Bellizzi is a village and comune in the province of Cosenza in the Calabria region of southern Italy.

Situated in the Pollino National Park, the village is bordered by  Castrovillari, Cerchiara di Calabria, Civita and Terranova di Pollino. Its economy is mostly based on agriculture, animal husbandry and traditional craftsmanship.

References

Cities and towns in Calabria